Yu Hyo-jin (born April 5, 1981) is a South Korean football player.

Club statistics

References

External links
America Got Talent Short Stories

jsgoal

1981 births
Living people
South Korean footballers
South Korean expatriate footballers
J2 League players
Yokohama FC players
Expatriate footballers in Japan
South Korean expatriate sportspeople in Japan
Association football midfielders